Thomas Baldwin (born 10 June 1945) is an English former footballer who played in The Football League for Arsenal, Chelsea, Millwall, Manchester United and Brentford. He was capped twice by England at under-23 level.
It was thought that Tommy Baldwin was known as ' the sponge ' for his ability, under pressure, to hold the ball and shield it skilfully from opponents while seeking an opening to set up an attack, but according to his interview on The Chelsea Special podcast, it was because of his ability to soak up alcohol while in the pub with his teammates.

Career
Baldwin was born in Gateshead and played for Wrekenton Juniors before joining Arsenal. He turned professional in 1962, and made his league debut in the 3–0 defeat of Birmingham City in April 1965. In September 1966, he scored Arsenal's first ever goal in the League Cup competition, shortly before transferring to Chelsea in part-exchange for George Graham in 1966. Playing in an attacking role, he scored 17 goals in his first season, including one on his debut against Manchester City, and played in the 1967 FA Cup Final as Chelsea lost 2–1 to Tottenham Hotspur at Wembley.

He scored 16 goals in each of the next two seasons, but those years finished trophy-less. In 1970, he played in the Cup Final against Leeds United, this time finishing on the winning side as Chelsea won 2–1 in a replay. The following year, Baldwin helped inspire the side to a 2–1 win over Real Madrid in the Cup Winners' Cup final replay in Athens, but after that his star began to fade. Injuries, loss of form and disagreements with manager Dave Sexton over his social activities combined to reduce his opportunities to play, and after spells on loan at Manchester United and Millwall, in non-league football with Gravesend & Northfleet, and on non-contract terms at Brentford, he joined the coaching staff at Brentford.  He had made a total of 239 appearances for Chelsea, scoring 91 goals. In 1975, Baldwin played for the Seattle Sounders of the North American Soccer League. In 1976, the Sounders traded the rights to Baldwin to the Vancouver Whitecaps in exchange for Chris Bennett, but Baldwin did not sign with Vancouver.

References

External links
 
 Chelsea stats and photo at Sporting Heroes
 Seattle Sounders stats
 

1945 births
Living people
Footballers from Gateshead
English footballers
England under-23 international footballers
Association football forwards
Arsenal F.C. players
Chelsea F.C. players
Millwall F.C. players
Manchester United F.C. players
Ebbsfleet United F.C. players
Seattle Sounders (1974–1983) players
Brentford F.C. players
English Football League players
North American Soccer League (1968–1984) players
English expatriate footballers
Expatriate soccer players in the United States
Brentford F.C. non-playing staff
English expatriate sportspeople in the United States
FA Cup Final players